Saros cycle series 131 for lunar eclipses occurs at the moon's descending node, repeats every 18 years 11 and 1/3 days. It contains 72 member events, with 15 total eclipses, starting in 1950 and ending in 2202.

The series contains 57 umbral eclipses between 1553 and 2563 (total eclipses between 1950 and 2202).

List

See also 
 List of lunar eclipses
 List of Saros series for lunar eclipses

Notes

External links 
 www.hermit.org: Saros 131

Lunar saros series